Benitoa is a genus of flowering plants in the family Asteraceae.

Benitoa  is a monotypic genus containing the single species Benitoa occidentalis, which is known simply as benitoa. It is sometimes included in genus Lessingia as the synonym Lessingia occidentalis.

Benitoa is endemic to California, where it is known mostly from San Benito County, the region for which it is named. Additional populations have been found in nearby parts of Fresno and Monterey Counties.

References

External links
Jepson eFlora treatment of Benitoa occidentalis
United States Department of Agriculture Plants Profile
CalPhotos Photo Gallery, University of California

Astereae
Monotypic Asteraceae genera
Endemic flora of California